Below is a list of cycad species by ordered by country.

Africa

Southern Africa

South Africa
Encephalartos aemulans
Encephalartos altensteinii
Encephalartos arenarius
Encephalartos brevifoliolatus
Encephalartos caffer
Encephalartos cerinus
Encephalartos cupidus
Encephalartos cycadifolius
Encephalartos dolomiticus
Encephalartos dyerianus
Encephalartos eugene-maraisii
Encephalartos ferox
Encephalartos friderici-guilielmi
Encephalartos ghellinckii
Encephalartos heenanii
Encephalartos hirsutus
Encephalartos horridus
Encephalartos humilis
Encephalartos inopinus
Encephalartos laevifolius
Encephalartos lanatus
Encephalartos latifrons
Encephalartos lebomboensis
Encephalartos lehmannii
Encephalartos longifolius
Encephalartos middelburgensis
Encephalartos msinganus
Encephalartos natalensis
Encephalartos ngoyanus
Encephalartos nubimontanus
Encephalartos paucidentatus
Encephalartos princeps
Encephalartos senticosus
Encephalartos transvenosus
Encephalartos trispinosus
Encephalartos villosus
Encephalartos woodii
Stangeria eriopus

Eswatini
Encephalartos aplanatus
Encephalartos heenanii
Encephalartos laevifolius
Encephalartos lebomboensis
Encephalartos ngoyanus
Encephalartos paucidentatus
Encephalartos relictus
Encephalartos senticosus
Encephalartos umbeluziensis
Encephalartos villosus

Mozambique
Cycas thouarsii
Encephalartos chimanimaniensis
Encephalartos ferox
Encephalartos gratus
Encephalartos lebomboensis
Encephalartos manikensis
Encephalartos munchii
Encephalartos pterogonus
Encephalartos turneri
Encephalartos umbeluziensis

Malawi
Encephalartos gratus

Zimbabwe
Encephalartos chimanimaniensis
Encephalartos concinnus
Encephalartos manikensis

Zambia
Encephalartos schmitzii

Angola
Encephalartos laurentianus

Democratic Republic of the Congo
Encephalartos laurentianus
Encephalartos ituriensis
Encephalartos marunguensis
Encephalartos poggei
Encephalartos schaijesii
Encephalartos schmitzii

East Africa
Cycas thouarsii is the most geographically widespread species, and is found in Indian Ocean islands as well.

Tanzania
Cycas thouarsii
Encephalartos bubalinus
Encephalartos delucanus
Encephalartos hildebrandtii
Encephalartos sclavoi

Kenya
Cycas thouarsii
Encephalartos bubalinus
Encephalartos hildebrandtii
Encephalartos kisambo
Encephalartos tegulaneus
Encephalartos tegulaneus subsp. powysii

Uganda
Encephalartos equatorialis
Encephalartos macrostrobilus
Encephalartos septentrionalis
Encephalartos whitelockii

South Sudan
Encephalartos mackenziei
Encephalartos septentrionalis

Madagascar
Cycas thouarsii

Comoros
Cycas thouarsii

Seychelles
Cycas thouarsii

West Africa
Encephalartos barteri is the only cycad species recorded in West Africa.

Nigeria
Encephalartos barteri
Encephalartos barteri subsp. allochrous

Benin
Encephalartos barteri

Togo
?Encephalartos barteri

Ghana
Encephalartos barteri

South Asia
Cycas pectinata has the most widespread distribution in South Asia, and is the only South Asian cycad species found outside India and Sri Lanka.

India
Cycas andamanica
Cycas annaikalensis
Cycas beddomei
Cycas circinalis
Cycas indica
Cycas nathorstii
Cycas pectinata
Cycas sphaerica
Cycas zeylanica
Cycas orixensis

Sri Lanka
Cycas nathorstii
Cycas zeylanica

Bangladesh
Cycas pectinata

Bhutan
Cycas pectinata

Nepal
Cycas pectinata

East Asia

Japan
Cycas revoluta

China
Cycas balansae
Cycas bifida
Cycas changjiangensis
Cycas chenii
Cycas debaoensis
Cycas diannanensis
Cycas dolichophylla
Cycas ferruginea
Cycas guizhouensis
Cycas hainanensis
Cycas hongheensis
Cycas multipinnata
Cycas panzhihuaensis
Cycas pectinata
Cycas revoluta
Cycas segmentifida
Cycas sexseminifera
Cycas shanyaensis
Cycas szechuanensis
Cycas szechuanensis subsp. fairylakea
Cycas taiwaniana
Cycas tanqingii

Taiwan 

 Cycas taitungensis

Southeast Asia

Vietnam 
Cycas aculeata
Cycas balansae
Cycas bifida
Cycas brachycantha
Cycas chevalieri
Cycas clivicola
Cycas collina
Cycas condaoensis
Cycas diannanensis
Cycas dolichophylla
Cycas edentata
Cycas elongata
Cycas ferruginea
Cycas fugax
Cycas hoabinhensis
Cycas inermis
Cycas lindstromii
Cycas micholitzii
Cycas multipinnata
Cycas pachypoda
Cycas pectinata
Cycas segmentifida
Cycas sexseminifera
Cycas siamensis
Cycas simplicipinna
?Cycas tanqingii
Cycas tropophylla

Laos
?Cycas micholitzii
Cycas pectinata
Cycas siamensis
Cycas simplicipinna

Thailand
Cycas chamaoensis
Cycas clivicola
Cycas edentata
Cycas elephantipes
Cycas macrocarpa
Cycas nongnoochiae
Cycas pectinata
Cycas petraea
Cycas pranburiensis
Cycas siamensis
Cycas simplicipinna
Cycas tansachana

Cambodia
Cycas clivicola
Cycas siamensis

Myanmar
Cycas edentata
Cycas pectinata
Cycas siamensis
Cycas simplicipinna

Malaysia
Cycas cantafolia
Cycas clivicola
Cycas edentata
Cycas macrocarpa

Singapore
Cycas edentata

Philippines
Cycas aenigma
Cycas curranii
Cycas edentata
Cycas lacrimans
Cycas nitida
Cycas riuminiana
Cycas sancti-lasallei
Cycas saxatilis
Cycas vespertilio
Cycas wadei
Cycas zambalensis

Indonesia
Cycas apoa
Cycas edentata
Cycas falcata
Cycas glauca
Cycas javana
Cycas montana
Cycas papuana
Cycas rumphii
Cycas scratchleyana
Cycas sundaica

East Timor
Cycas glauca

Oceania
The eastern coast of Australia contains the most diversity. Cycas seemannii is found in Melanesia and western Polynesia. Cycas micronesica is found in Micronesia.

Australia
Bowenia serrulata
Bowenia spectabilis
Cycas angulata
Cycas arenicola
Cycas armstrongii
Cycas arnhemica
Cycas arnhemica subsp. muninga
Cycas arnhemica subsp. natja
Cycas badensis
Cycas basaltica
Cycas brunnea
Cycas cairnsiana
Cycas calcicola
Cycas canalis
Cycas candida
Cycas conferta
Cycas couttsiana
Cycas cupida
Cycas desolata
Cycas furfuracea
Cycas lane-poolei
Cycas maconochiei
Cycas maconochiei subsp. lanata
Cycas maconochiei subsp. viridis
Cycas media
Cycas media subsp. ensata
Cycas media subsp. banksii
Cycas megacarpa
Cycas ophiolitica
Cycas orientis
Cycas platyphylla
Cycas pruinosa
Cycas rumphii
Cycas seemannii
Cycas semota
Cycas silvestris
Cycas tuckeri
Cycas xipholepis
Cycas yorkiana
Lepidozamia hopei
Lepidozamia peroffskyana
Macrozamia cardiacensis
Macrozamia communis
Macrozamia concinna
Macrozamia conferta
Macrozamia cranei
Macrozamia crassifolia
Macrozamia diplomera
Macrozamia douglasii
Macrozamia dyeri
Macrozamia elegans
Macrozamia fawcettii
Macrozamia fearnsidei
Macrozamia flexuosa
Macrozamia fraseri
Macrozamia glaucophylla
Macrozamia heteromera
Macrozamia humilis
Macrozamia johnsonii
Macrozamia lomandroides
Macrozamia longispina
Macrozamia lucida
Macrozamia macdonnellii
Macrozamia machinii
Macrozamia macleayi
Macrozamia miquelii
Macrozamia montana
Macrozamia moorei
Macrozamia mountperriensis
Macrozamia occidua
Macrozamia parcifolia
Macrozamia pauli-guilielmi
Macrozamia platyrhachis
Macrozamia plurinervia
Macrozamia polymorpha
Macrozamia reducta
Macrozamia riedlei
Macrozamia secunda
Macrozamia serpentina
Macrozamia spiralis
Macrozamia stenomera
Macrozamia viridis

Papua New Guinea
Cycas apoa
Cycas bougainvilleana
Cycas campestris
Cycas papuana
Cycas rumphii
Cycas schumanniana
Cycas scratchleyana

Solomon Islands
Cycas bougainvilleana

New Caledonia
Cycas seemannii

Vanuatu
Cycas seemannii

Fiji
Cycas seemannii

Tonga
Cycas seemannii

Palau
Cycas micronesica

Micronesia
Cycas micronesica

Guam
Cycas micronesica

Northern Mariana Islands
Cycas micronesica

North America and Caribbean

United States
Zamia integrifolia

Bahamas
Zamia angustifolia
Zamia integrifolia
Zamia lucayana

Cayman Islands
Zamia integrifolia

Cuba
Zamia angustifolia
Zamia erosa
Zamia integrifolia
Zamia pumila
Zamia pygmaea
Zamia stricta
Microcycas calocoma

Dominican Republic
Zamia pumila

Puerto Rico
Zamia erosa
Zamia portoricensis
Zamia pumila

Jamaica
Zamia erosa

Central America

Mexico
Ceratozamia alvarezii
Ceratozamia becerrae
Ceratozamia brevifrons
Ceratozamia chimalapensis
Ceratozamia decumbens
Ceratozamia euryphyllidia
Ceratozamia fuscoviridis
Ceratozamia hildae
Ceratozamia huastecorum
Ceratozamia kuesteriana
Ceratozamia latifolia
Ceratozamia matudae
Ceratozamia mexicana
Ceratozamia microstrobila
Ceratozamia miqueliana
Ceratozamia mirandae
Ceratozamia mixeorum
Ceratozamia morettii
Ceratozamia norstogii
Ceratozamia robusta
Ceratozamia sabatoi
Ceratozamia santillanii
Ceratozamia vovidesii
Ceratozamia whitelockiana
Ceratozamia zaragozae
Ceratozamia zoquorum
Dioon angustifolium
Dioon argenteum
Dioon califanoi
Dioon caputoi
Dioon edule
Dioon holmgrenii
Dioon merolae
Dioon purpusii
Dioon rzedowskii
Dioon sonorense
Dioon spinulosum
Dioon stevensonii
Dioon tomasellii
Zamia cremnophila
Zamia fischeri
Zamia furfuracea
Zamia grijalvensis
Zamia herrerae
Zamia inermis
Zamia katzeriana
Zamia lacandona
Zamia loddigesii
Zamia paucijuga
Zamia prasina
Zamia purpurea
Zamia soconuscensis
Zamia spartea
Zamia variegata
Zamia vazquezii

Belize
Ceratozamia robusta
Zamia decumbens
Zamia meermanii
Zamia prasina
Zamia variegata

Guatemala
Ceratozamia matudae
Ceratozamia robusta
Zamia herrerae
Zamia monticola
Zamia prasina
Zamia standleyi
Zamia tuerckheimii
Zamia variegata

El Salvador
Zamia herrerae

Honduras
Ceratozamia hondurensis
Dioon mejiae
Zamia onan-reyesii
Zamia oreillyi
Zamia sandovalii
Zamia standleyi

Nicaragua
Zamia neurophyllidia

Costa Rica
Zamia acuminata
Zamia fairchildiana
Zamia gomeziana
Zamia neurophyllidia
Zamia pseudomonticola

Panama
Zamia cunaria
Zamia dressleri
Zamia elegantissima
Zamia fairchildiana
Zamia hamannii
Zamia imperialis
Zamia ipetiensis
Zamia lindleyi
Zamia manicata
Zamia nana
Zamia nesophila
Zamia neurophyllidia
Zamia obliqua
Zamia pseudomonticola
Zamia pseudoparasitica
Zamia skinneri
Zamia stevensonii

South America

Colombia
Zamia amazonum
Zamia amplifolia
Zamia chigua
Zamia disodon
Zamia encephalartoides
Zamia huilensis
Zamia hymenophyllidia
Zamia incognita
Zamia lecointei
Zamia manicata
Zamia melanorrhachis
Zamia montana
Zamia muricata
Zamia obliqua
Zamia pyrophylla
Zamia restrepoi
Zamia roezlii
Zamia tolimensis
Zamia ulei
Zamia wallisii

Ecuador
Zamia amazonum
Zamia gentryi
Zamia lindenii
Zamia roezlii
Zamia ulei

Peru
Zamia amazonum
Zamia hymenophyllidia
Zamia lecointei
Zamia lindenii
Zamia macrochiera
Zamia poeppigiana
Zamia ulei
Zamia urep

Bolivia
Zamia boliviana

Venezuela
Zamia amazonum
Zamia lecointei
Zamia muricata

Brazil
Zamia amazonum
Zamia boliviana
Zamia lecointei
Zamia poeppigiana
Zamia ulei

References

Catherine Rutherford, John Donaldson, Alex Hudson, H. Noel McGough, Maurizio Sajeva, Uwe Schippmann, and Maurice Tse-Laurence. CITES and Cycads: a user’s guide. Royal Botanic Gardens, Kew: Kew Publishing.

Cycads
cycad